Pareboda is a genus of moths belonging to the subfamily Tortricinae of the family Tortricidae. It contains only one species, Pareboda prosecta, which is found in New Guinea.

See also
List of Tortricidae genera

References

 , 2005: World Catalogue of Insects vol. 5 Tortricidae.

External links
tortricidae.com

Tortricini
Monotypic moth genera
Taxa named by Józef Razowski
Moths of New Guinea
Tortricidae genera